Hemchandra Goswami (1872–1928) was an Indian writer, poet, historian, teacher and a linguist from Assam in the early part of modern Assamese literature. He was the fourth president of the Asom Sahitya Sabha in 1920 held at Tezpur. He retired as Extra Assistant Commissioner in the British Assam..

Literacy works
Goswami published the first Assamese dictionary, Hemkosh by Hemchandra Barua with the help of Colonel Gordon in 1900. Some of his other works include Asamiya sahityar chaneki, Phular Saki (The Bunch of Flowers, 1907), which contains the first sonnet in Assamese — 'Priyatamar Sithi' (A letter from the beloved), Kako aru hiya nibilao etc. 'Katha Gita' (Gita in Prose) of Bhattadev  was edited by him in 1918. which contains the first sonnet in Assamese — 'Priyatamar Cithi' (A letter from the beloved)

See also
 History of Assamese literature
 List of Assamese writers with their pen names

References

External links

 Becoming a Borderland: The Politics of Space and Identity in Colonial by Sanghamitra Misra.

1872 births
1928 deaths
Poets from Assam
Asom Sahitya Sabha Presidents
Writers from Northeast India
People from Golaghat district
Assamese-language poets
19th-century Indian poets
20th-century Indian poets
Indian male poets
19th-century Indian male writers
20th-century Indian male writers
Scholars from Assam
20th-century Indian linguists
19th-century Indian linguists
20th-century Indian historians
19th-century Indian historians